Komsomolsky is a rural locality (a settlement) in Ust-Berezovskoye Rural Settlement, Yurlinsky District, Perm Krai, Russia. The population was 209 as of 2010. There are 6 streets.

Geography 
Komsomolsky is located 43 km northwest of Yurla (the district's administrative centre) by road. Lipova is the nearest rural locality.

References 

Rural localities in Yurlinsky District